The 2018 Rugby Championship was the seventh edition of the expanded annual southern hemisphere Rugby Championship, featuring Argentina, Australia, South Africa and New Zealand. The competition is operated by SANZAAR, a joint venture of the four countries' national unions.

The tournament continued to use the same sequence of games across the schedule, starting on 18 August with Australia hosting reigning champions New Zealand and South Africa hosting Argentina, and ending after eight weeks (six rounds and two bye weeks) on 6 October when New Zealand visited South Africa and Australia played in Argentina.

New Zealand won the Championship for the sixth time after a 35-17 win over Argentina in Buenos Aires on 29 September.

Background
The tournament is operated by SANZAAR and known for sponsorship reasons as The Castle Rugby Championship in South Africa, The Investec Rugby Championship in New Zealand, The Mitsubishi Estate Rugby Championship in Australia, and The Personal Rugby Championship in Argentina.

Format
The format for the 2018 tournament retained the previous Championship format that changed in 2017. Each side played the other once at home, and once away, giving a total of six matches each, and twelve in total. A win earned a team four league points, a draw two league points, and a loss by eight or more points zero league points. A bonus point was earned in one of two ways: by scoring at least three tries more than the opponent in a match, or by losing within seven points. The competition winner was the side with the most points at the end of the tournament.

Table

Results

Round 1

Notes:
 Jermaine Ainsley and Jack Maddocks (both Australia) and Tim Perry (New Zealand) made their international debuts.	
 Sam Whitelock (New Zealand) became the eighth and youngest ever All Black to earn his 100th test cap.	

Notes:
 Marco van Staden and Damian Willemse (both South Africa) and Diego Fortuny (Argentina) made their international debuts.	
 Pablo Matera (Argentina) earned his 50th test cap.

Round 2

Notes:
 Folau Fainga'a and Tom Banks (both Australia) made their international debuts.
 Owen Franks (New Zealand) became the ninth ever All Black to earn his 100th test cap.
 New Zealand retain the Bledisloe Cup.	

Notes:
 Facundo Bosch (Argentina) made his international debut.	
 This is Argentina's largest winning margin over South Africa, surpassing the 12-point difference set in 2015.

Round 3

Notes:
 Te Toiroa Tahuriorangi (New Zealand) and Juan Pablo Zeiss (Argentina) made their international debuts.

Notes:
 Cheslin Kolbe (South Africa) made his international debut.
 Australia retain the Mandela Challenge Plate.

Round 4

 South Africa recorded their first win against New Zealand in New Zealand since their 32–29 win in 2009.

Notes:
 Argentina recorded their first win against Australia in Australia since their 18–3 win in 1983.
 This win saw Argentina achieved two wins in a single Rugby Championship for the first time.
 With this loss (and South Africa's victory), Australia drops to a record low seventh place on the World Rugby Rankings.

Round 5

Notes:
 Scott Sio (Australia) earned his 50th test cap.

Notes:
 Angus Ta'avao (New Zealand) made his international debut.
 TJ Perenara (New Zealand) earned his 50th test cap.

Round 6

Notes:
 Willie le Roux (South Africa) earned his 50th test cap.
 New Zealand retain the Freedom Cup.

Notes:
 Matías Alemanno and Nahuel Tetaz Chaparro (both Argentina) made earned their 50th test cap.
 Australia retain the Puma Trophy.

Statistics

Points scorers

Try scorers

Squads

Note: Ages, caps and clubs/franchises are of 18 August 2018 – the starting date of the tournament

Argentina
On 6 August, newly appointed head coach Mario Ledesma named a 36-man squad for the Championship.

1 Ahead of the traveling to South Africa for the opening match, Tomás Lezana joined the squad after recovering from injury.

2 On 9 August, Juan Figallo became the first European based player to be selected for the national side since the 2015 World Cup, after a change of selection policy under Ledesma.

3 On 19 August, Santiago Álvarez, Facundo Bosch and Santiago Carreras joined the ahead of the round 2 home clash against South Africa.

4 On 27 August, Gaston Cortes joined the squad for the Oceania leg of the Championship in rounds 3 and 4.

5 On 19 September, Ramiro Herrera, Matías Osadczuk, Lucas Paulos and Enrique Pieretto joined were added as part of the training squad ahead of the fifth round clash with New Zealand.

6 On 24 September, Manuel Montero joined the squad as injury cover for Ramiro Moyano.

Australia
On 5 August, Michael Cheika named a 36-man extended squad ahead of the Championship.

1 On 21 September, Jake Gordon and Angus Cottrell were added to the squad for the final two rounds of the Championship, with the latter replacing Lukhan Tui who withdrew from the squad for personal reasons.

New Zealand
On 6 August 2018, Hansen named a 33-man squad ahead of the Championship.

Liam Coltman and Ngani Laumape were included in the squad as injury covers for Dane Coles and Sonny Bill Williams respectively.

1 On 16 August, Ofa Tu'ungafasi, after being named in the match-day team for the opening round, was withdrawn due to injury and Jeffery Toomaga-Allen joined the squad as a precautionary injury cover.

2 On 30 August, Angus Ta'avao joined the squad as an injury replacement for Joe Moody who was ruled out of the rest of the Championship.

3 On 9 September, Patrick Tuipulotu joined the squad as an injury replacement for Brodie Retallick.

South Africa
On 26 May 2018, head coach Rassie Erasmus named the following 35-man squad for South Africa's Rugby Championship campaign:

Cyle Brink withdrew from the squad on 16 August 2018 after sustaining a knee injury in training. He was not replaced.

1 On 31 August, Schalk Brits, Damian de Allende and Cheslin Kolbe were added to the squad ahead of the Australasian leg of the Championship in rounds 3 and 4.

2 On 23 September, Vincent Koch, Ruhan Nel and S'busiso Nkosi were added to the squad ahead of round 5 and 6.

See also
 History of rugby union matches between Argentina and Australia
 History of rugby union matches between Argentina and New Zealand
 History of rugby union matches between Argentina and South Africa
 History of rugby union matches between Australia and South Africa
 History of rugby union matches between Australia and New Zealand
 History of rugby union matches between New Zealand and South Africa

References

2018 in Argentine rugby union
2018 in Australian rugby union
2018 in New Zealand rugby union
2018 in South African rugby union
2018 rugby union tournaments for national teams
August 2018 sports events in Africa
August 2018 sports events in Oceania
August 2018 sports events in South America
September 2018 sports events in Africa
September 2018 sports events in Oceania
September 2018 sports events in South America
October 2018 sports events in Africa
October 2018 sports events in South America
2018